Jurin's law, or capillary rise, is the simplest analysis of capillary action—the induced motion of liquids in small channels—and states that the maximum height of a liquid in a capillary tube is inversely proportional to the tube's diameter. Capillary action is one of the most common fluid mechanical effects explored in the field of microfluidics. Jurin's law is named after James Jurin, who discovered it between 1718 and 1719.  His quantitative law suggests that the maximum height of liquid in a capillary tube is inversely proportional to the tube's diameter. The difference in height between the surroundings of the tube and the inside, as well as the shape of the meniscus, are caused by capillary action. The mathematical expression of this law can be derived directly from hydrostatic principles and the Young–Laplace equation. Jurin's law allows the measurement of the surface tension of a liquid and can be used to derive the capillary length.

Formulation 
The law is expressed as

,

where
 h is the liquid height;
  is the surface tension;
 θ is the contact angle of the liquid on the tube wall;
 ρ is the mass density (mass per unit volume);
 r0 is the tube radius;
 g is the gravitational acceleration.

It is only valid if the tube is cylindrical and has a radius (r0) smaller than the capillary length. In terms of the capillary length, the law can be written as
.

Examples 

Because water spreads on clean glass, the effective equilibrium contact angle is approximately zero. For these values, the height of the water column is

Thus for a  radius glass tube in lab conditions given above, the water would rise an unnoticeable . However, for a  radius tube, the water would rise , and for a  radius tube, the water would rise .

Capillary action is used by many plants to bring up water from the soil. For tall trees (larger than ~10 m (32 ft)), other processes like osmotic pressure and negative pressures are also important.

History 
During the 15th century, Leonardo da Vinci was one of the first to propose that mountain streams could result from the rise of water through small capillary cracks. 

It is later, in the 17th century, that the theories about the origin of capillary action begin to appear. Jacques Rohault erroneously supposed that the rise of the liquid in a capillary could be due to the suppression of air inside and the creation of a vacuum. The astronomer Geminiano Montanari  was one of the first to compare the capillary action to the circulation of sap in plants. Additionally, the experiments of Giovanni Alfonso Borelli determined in 1670 that the height of the rise was inversely proportional to the radius of the tube. 

Francis Hauksbee, in 1713, refuted the theory of Rohault through a series of experiments on capillary action, a phenomenon that was observable in air as well as in vacuum. Hauksbee also demonstrated that the liquid rise appeared on different geometries (not only circular cross sections), and on different liquids and tube materials, and showed that there was no dependence on the thickness of the tube walls. Isaac Newton reported the experiments of Hauskbee in his work Opticks but without attribution. 

It was the English physiologist James Jurin, who finally in 1718 confirmed the experiments of Borelli and the law was named in his honour.

Derivation 

The height  of the liquid column in the tube is constrained by the hydrostatic pressure and by the surface tension. The following derivation is for a liquid that rises in the tube; for the opposite case when the liquid is below the reference level, the derivation is analogous but pressure differences may change sign.

Laplace pressure 
Above the interface between the liquid and the surface, the pressure is equal to the atmospheric pressure . The Laplace pressure is then calculated according to the Young-Laplace equation:where  is the surface tension.

Hydrostatic pressure 
Outside and far from the tube, the liquid reaches a ground level in contact with the atmosphere. Liquids in communicating vessels have the same pressures at the same heights, so a point , inside the tube, at the same liquid level as outside, would have the same pressure . Yet the pressure at this point follows a vertical pressure variation as
 
where  is the gravitational acceleration and  the density of the liquid. This equation means that the pressure at point  is the pressure at the interface plus the pressure due to the weight of the liquid column of height . In this way, we can calculate the pressure at the convex interface

Result at equlibrium 

The hydrostatic analysis shows that , combining this with the Laplace pressure calculation we have:solving for  returns Jurin's law.

References 
Fluid dynamics
Hydrology